Andreas Möller (born 2 September 1967) is a German former professional footballer who played as an attacking midfielder. He is the head of the youth department at Eintracht Frankfurt.

Club career

At club level, Möller played for Eintracht Frankfurt (1985–87, 1990–92, 2003–04), Borussia Dortmund (1988–90, 1994–2000), Juventus (1992–94), and Schalke 04 (2000–03).

In his first spell with Borussia Dortmund, he won the DFB-Pokal during the 1988–89 season. After moving to Italian side Juventus, he won the UEFA Cup in 1993, beating out his former club, Borussia Dortmund, 6–1 on aggregate, with Möller scoring one of the goals and providing three assists across both legs of the final. Upon his return to Dortmund, he won several domestic titles with the club, including consecutive Bundesliga titles in 1995 and 1996, as well as the Champions League in 1997, once again beating his former team, Juventus on this occasion, 3–1, and providing two assists during the match, while his corner also led to the opening goal; he followed up the victory with the Intercontinental Cup later that year, after which he was named Man of the Match. With Schalke, he won the DFB-Pokal twice more in 2001 and 2002.

International career
With the Germany national team, Möller was capped 85 times between 1988 and 1999, scoring 29 goals. He took part at five major international tournaments, winning the 1990 World Cup and Euro 96. He also played for his country at Euro 92, where his team reached the final, only to lose out 2–0 to Denmark (although Möller did not feature during the match), as well as the 1994 and 1998 World Cups, in which Germany suffered quarter-final eliminations; in the former edition of the tournament, Germany were eliminated following a surprising 2–1 defeat to Bulgaria, while in the latter edition, Germany lost out 3–0 to Croatia. Möller did not play in the 1–0 victory over Argentina in the 1990 World Cup Final and was also suspended for Germany's 2–1 golden goal victory over Czech Republic in the final of Euro 96 after he was booked in the semi-final against hosts England; in the resulting shoot out of the latter match, following a 1–1 draw after extra-time, Möller scored the winning penalty, which he celebrated by mimicking the bravado of the pose struck earlier in the shoot out when Paul Gascoigne had converted his penalty.

Style of play
Described by Stephan Uersfeld of ESPN FC as "one of the greatest midfielders of his generation", Möller was a talented, versatile, and complete advanced playmaker, who was known for his range of passing, creativity, vision, intelligence, and technical ability, as well as his agility, reactions, and his speed of thought and execution, which enabled him to play first–time passes; he also had the ability to carry the ball or run forward at defences while in possession. In addition to his creative capabilities and ability to provide assists to teammates, he was also known for his goalscoring, courtesy of his powerful and accurate striking ability with either foot, as well as his heading ability, which allowed him to excel in the air; his offensive qualities also allowed him to be deployed in more advanced roles, as a supporting striker or even as a winger on occasion, in addition to his usual central position as an attacking midfielder behind the strikers. He was also a free kick specialist.

After retirement

In June 2007, Möller started his career as football manager at Viktoria Aschaffenburg, playing in the Oberliga Hessen. From 2008 to 2011, he was athletic director for Kickers Offenbach.

On 20 October 2015, Möller was given a job for the Hungary national team. Here he worked as an assistant for Bernd Storck. They played together for Borussia Dortmund when Dortmund won the West German Cup in the 1988–89 season.

On 5 October 2019, Möller returned to Eintracht Frankfurt and was hired as head of the youth department.

Media
Möller features in EA Sports' FIFA video game series; he was on the cover of the German edition of FIFA 98.

Career statistics

Club

1 Including appearances in 1989 DFB-Supercup, 1995 DFB-Supercup, 1996 DFB-Supercup and 1997 Intercontinental Cup.

International

Honours
Borussia Dortmund
 Bundesliga: 1994–95, 1995–96
 DFB-Pokal: 1988–89
 DFL-Supercup: 1989, 1995, 1996
 UEFA Champions League: 1996–97
 Intercontinental Cup: 1997

Juventus
 UEFA Cup: 1992–93

Schalke 04
 DFB-Pokal: 2000–01, 2001–02

Germany
 FIFA World Cup: 1990
 UEFA European Championship: 1996
 US Cup: 1993

Individual
 kicker Bundesliga Team of the Season: 1988–89, 1989–90, 1990–91, 1991–92, 1995–96, 2000–01
 Bundesliga top assist provider: 1989–90, 1995–96
 kicker'' Bundesliga-best offensive midfielder: 1990, 1991
 Intercontinental Cup MVP of the Match Award: 1997

References

External links

 

1967 births
Living people
Footballers from Frankfurt
German expatriate footballers
German footballers
German football managers
Borussia Dortmund players
Eintracht Frankfurt players
Juventus F.C. players
FC Schalke 04 players
Serie A players
Germany international footballers
Germany under-21 international footballers
Association football midfielders
1990 FIFA World Cup players
1994 FIFA World Cup players
1998 FIFA World Cup players
FIFA World Cup-winning players
UEFA Euro 1992 players
UEFA Euro 1996 players
UEFA European Championship-winning players
Bundesliga players
Expatriate footballers in Italy
German expatriate sportspeople in Italy
Viktoria Aschaffenburg managers
UEFA Champions League winning players
UEFA Cup winning players
West German footballers